Múcio Carneiro Leão was a Brazilian journalist, poet, short story writer, critic, novelist, essayist and speaker. He was born in Recife on February 17, 1898, and died in Rio de Janeiro, RJ, on August 12, 1969.

His parents were Dr. Laurindo Leão and Maria Felicíssima Carneiro Leão. He completed his secondary studies in Recife, at the Instituto Ginasial Pernambucano. He graduated in Law in 1919, and soon after moved to Rio de Janeiro, becoming a writer for Correio da Manhã. In 1923 he left the Correio da Manhã, moving to Jornal do Brasil. His successor as critic at the Correio da Manhã was Humberto de Campos.

In 1941, with Cassiano Ricardo and Ribeiro Couto, he founded the morning newspaper A Manhã, where he created the literary supplement "Authors and Books", which he ran for many years and which has become an important repository of Brazilian literature.

Múcio Leão held the following public positions or commissions: cabinet officer of the Minister of Finance (1925); general inspector of lotteries (1926); fiscal agent of the Consumption Tax (1926); chairman of the Theater Commission of the Ministry of Education (1939); professor of the Journalism course at the Faculty of Philosophy of the University of Brazil.

He was the fourth occupant of Chair 20 at the Brazilian Academy of Letters, to which he was elected on September 19, 1935, in succession to Humberto de Campos. He was received by Academic Pereira da Silva on November 16, 1935. At the Academy, he was second secretary (1936); first secretary (1937, 1938); secretary-general (1942, 1943, 1946 and 1948) and president (1944). He organized numerous publications, notably the critical work of João Ribeiro: Critical Studies (1934), Brazilian Classics and Romantics (1952), The Moderns (1952), Parnassianism and Symbolism (1957), Fiction Authors (1959), Critics and Essays (1959), Philologists (1961), Historians (1961). In 1960, he gave a series of three lectures at the Brazilian Historical and Geographic Institute, under the title “João Ribeiro's Thought” (published in the magazine of the institute, vol. 248, July–September 1961).

References

Brazilian writers